Duncan Cameron Moodie (7 May 1897 – 18 April 1960) was an  Australian rules footballer who played with Geelong and St Kilda in the Victorian Football League (VFL).

Notes

External links 

1897 births
1960 deaths
Australian rules footballers from Geelong
Geelong Football Club players
St Kilda Football Club players